The All-Ireland Senior Hurling Championship 1898 was the 12th series of the All-Ireland Senior Hurling Championship, Ireland's premier hurling knock-out competition.  Tipperary won the championship, beating Kilkenny 7-13 to 3-10 in the final.

Format

All-Ireland Championship

Semi-final: (1 match) This is a lone game which sees the winners of the Munster championship play Galway who receive a bye to this stage. One team is eliminated while the winning team advances to the final.

Final: (1 match) The winners of the lone semi-final play the winners of the Munster championship.

Results

Leinster Senior Hurling Championship

Munster Senior Hurling Championship

All-Ireland Senior Hurling Championship

Championship statistics

Miscellaneous

 The Munster final between Cork and Tipperary had to be abandoned due to fading light.  Both sides were level at the time and a replay later took place.
 Mikey Maher of Tipperary became the first player to captain a team to three All-Ireland final victories.

References

Sources

 Corry, Eoghan, The GAA Book of Lists (Hodder Headline Ireland, 2005).
 Donegan, Des, The Complete Handbook of Gaelic Games (DBA Publications Limited, 2005).

1898
All-Ireland Senior Hurling Championship